The Metropolitan University of Tirana, abbreviated UMT, is a private university located in Tirana, Albania. It was founded in 2011, by a group of architects and engineers as the only Albanian university on information technology, engineering and architecture.

See also
List of universities in Albania
List of colleges and universities
List of colleges and universities by country

References

External links
 UMT official website

Universities and colleges in Tirana
Educational institutions established in 2011
2011 establishments in Albania
Universities in Albania